Alaca (Georgian:ალაcა), is a village in the Borçka District, Artvin Province, Turkey. Its population is 382 (2021).

Its distance is 41 km to Artvin and 9 km to Borçka.

References

Villages in Borçka District